Millî Gazete ("National Newspaper") is an Islamist Turkish daily newspaper that is aligned to the Milli Görüş ideology. It was founded in 1973, and the first issue appeared on 12 January 1973. The paper was aligned with the Islamist National Salvation Party (Millî Selâmet Partisi). It publishes a German edition in Germany, which is linked with the Millî Görüş organization.
Following the military coup on 12 September 1980 Millî Gazete was temporarily closed four times by the authorities.

References

External links 
The newspaper's web site 

1973 establishments in Turkey
Censorship in Turkey
Daily newspapers published in Turkey
Far-right politics in Turkey
Newspapers published in Istanbul
Publications established in 1973
Turkish-language newspapers
Fatih